 
Day of reckoning refers to the Last Judgment of God in Christian and Islamic belief during which everyone after death is called to account for their actions committed in life.

Day of Reckoning may also refer to:

Music
Day of Reckoning (Destruction album) a 2011 studio album by Destruction
Day of Reckoning (Diecast album), a 2001 album by Diecast
Day of Reckoning (Pentagram album), a 1987 album by the doom metal band Pentagram
"Reckoning Day", the first song on the Megadeth album Youthanasia
"A Day of Reckoning", a song on the Testament Album The New Order

Literature
Day of Reckoning (book), 2007 book by Pat Buchanan
The Day of Reckoning (novel), the eighth novel in the Jedi Apprentice Star Wars series
Day of Reckoning (novel), a 2000 novel by Jack Higgins

Film
The Day of Reckoning (film), a 1915 film directed by B. Reeves Eason
Day of Reckoning (1933 film), starring Richard Dix
Universal Soldier: Day of Reckoning, a 2012 film
Day of Reckoning (2016 film), starring Jackson Hurst

Television 
"Day of Reckoning", third episode of the 1964 Doctor Who serial The Dalek Invasion of Earth
"Day of Reckoning", third episode of series one of the sitcom Hi-de-Hi! (1980-1981) written by Jimmy Perry and David Croft.

In video games
WWE Day of Reckoning, a Nintendo GameCube video game
WWE Day of Reckoning 2, the sequel to above

In other contexts
Affliction: Day of Reckoning, a mixed martial arts event held on January 24, 2009